The Hofstra Pride softball team represents Hofstra University in NCAA Division I college softball. The team belongs to the Colonial Athletic Association and plays home games at Bill Edwards Stadium, which was named in honor of longtime coach Bill Edwards in 2015. The Pride have gone to the NCAA Tournament seventeen times, with their best finish being a Super Regionals Appearance in 2012, losing to South Florida by just one run to miss a spot in the Women's College World Series.

Year-by-year results
Results are from the NCAA Database along with Hofstra's respective conferences and are as of Hofstra's start as a Division I team in 1984.

†NCAA canceled 2020 collegiate activities due to the COVID-19 virus.

Retired Numbers
Hofstra Softball has retired six numbers in the program's history with Crystal Boyd's number thirteen being the first retired in 2008.

References

Hofstra University
Hofstra Pride softball